D'Amelio is an Italian surname, and may refer to:

Via D'Amelio bombing, a 1992 bombing in Sicily

People with the surname
Anthony D'Amelio (born 1964), American politician
Dixie D'Amelio (born 2001), American social media personality
Charli D'Amelio (born 2004), American social media personality
Frank D'Amelio (born 1957), American soccer player

See also
 Amelio, a given name and surname
 D'Alelio, a surname